The WCHA All-Tournament Team is an honor bestowed at the conclusion of the NCAA Division I Western Collegiate Hockey Association conference tournament to the players judged to have performed best during the championship. Currently the team is composed of three forwards, two defensemen and one goaltender with additional players named in the event of a tie.

Despite the tournament beginning in 1960 the WCHA All-Tournament Team wasn't named until 1988. Afterwards it was named annually until 2016 after which the honor ceased to be awarded.

All-Tournament Teams

1980s

1990s

2000s

2010s

All-Tournament Team players by school

Final members

Previous Members

Multiple appearances

See also
WCHA Awards
Most Valuable Player in Tournament

References 

WCHA All-Tour
WCHA Men's Ice Hockey Tournament